John Arthur Lithgow (born , 1945) is an American actor. Lithgow studied at Harvard University and the London Academy of Music and Dramatic Art before becoming known for his diverse work on the stage and screen. He has been the recipient of numerous accolades including six Emmy Awards, two Golden Globe Awards, three Screen Actors Guild Awards, and two Tony Awards. He has also received nominations for two Academy Awards, a BAFTA Award, and four Grammy Awards. Lithgow has received a star on the Hollywood Walk of Fame in 2001 and he was inducted into the American Theater Hall of Fame in 2005.

In 1973 Lithgow made his Broadway debut in The Changing Room for which he received his first Tony Award. In 1976 Lithgow acted alongside Meryl Streep in the plays 27 Wagons Full of Cotton, A Memory of Two Mondays and Secret Service at The Public Theatre. He received Tony Award nominations for Requiem for a Heavyweight (1985), M. Butterfly (1988), and Dirty Rotten Scoundrels (2005). In 2002, Lithgow received his second Tony Award, this time for a musical, The Sweet Smell of Success. In 2007, he made his Royal Shakespeare Company debut as Malvolio in Twelfth Night. He returned to Broadway in the plays The Columnist (2012), A Delicate Balance (2014), and Hillary and Clinton (2019). 

Lithgow starred as Dick Solomon in the television sitcom 3rd Rock from the Sun (1996–2001) winning three Primetime Emmy Awards for Best Actor in a Comedy Series. He received further Primetime Emmy Awards for his performances as Arthur Mitchell in the drama Dexter (2009) and as Winston Churchill in the Netflix drama The Crown (2016–2019). He also starred in HBO's Perry Mason (2020) and FX's The Old Man (2022). 

His early screen roles included Bob Fosse's All That Jazz (1979) and Brian De Palma's Blow Out (1981). He received Academy Award for Best Supporting Actor nominations for his performances in The World According to Garp (1982) and Terms of Endearment (1983). He then starred in the films Footloose (1984), Harry and the Hendersons (1987), The Pelican Brief (1993), A Civil Action (1998),  Shrek (2001), Kinsey (2004), Dreamgirls (2006), Love Is Strange (2014), Miss Sloane (2016), Beatriz at Dinner (2017), Late Night (2019), and Bombshell (2019).

Early life
Lithgow was born on October 19, 1945, in Rochester, New York. His mother, Sarah Jane Lithgow (née Price), was a retired actress. His father, Arthur Washington Lithgow III was a theatrical producer and director who ran McCarter Theatre in Princeton, New Jersey. His father was born in Puerto Plata, Dominican Republic, to a European-American family; his great-grandfather was a vice consul and vice commercial agent in the country. He is the third of four children and has three siblings: an older brother David Lithgow, an older sister Robin Lithgow, and a younger sister Sarah Jane Boaker. On the show Finding Your Roots, Lithgow discovered that he is a descendant of eight Mayflower passengers, including colonial governor William Bradford. Because of his father's job, the family moved frequently during Lithgow's childhood. He spent his childhood years in Yellow Springs, Ohio, where activist Coretta Scott King was his babysitter. He spent his teenage years in Akron (living at Stan Hywet Hall) and Lakewood, Ohio.

Lithgow graduated from Princeton High School while Mitch Miller was hosting Sing Along with Mitch in 1963. He then studied history and English literature at Harvard College. Lithgow lived in Adams House as an undergraduate and later served on Harvard's Board of Overseers. He credits a performance at Harvard of Gilbert and Sullivan's Utopia Limited with helping him decide to become an actor. He was a pupil of dramatist Robert Chapman who was the director of Harvard's Loeb Drama Center. Lithgow graduated from Harvard in 1967 with an A.B. magna cum laude and was elected to Phi Beta Kappa. After he graduated, Lithgow won a Fulbright Scholarship to study at the London Academy of Music and Dramatic Art. Also after graduation, he served as the Director of the Arts and Literature Department at WBAI, the Pacifica radio station in New York City.

Career

1970s 
In 1972, Lithgow made his film debut in Dealing: Or the Berkeley-to-Boston Forty-Brick Lost-Bag Blues. In 1976 he starred in a pivotal role in Brian De Palma's Obsession with Cliff Robertson and Genevieve Bujold as Cliff Robertson's long time business partner Robert Lasalle.

In 1973, Lithgow debuted on Broadway in David Storey's The Changing Room at the Morosco Theatre, earning him his first Tony nomination for Featured Actor in a Play and his first win. He also won a Drama Desk Award. The following year he starred again on Broadway in the comedy play My Fat Friend opposite Lynn Redgrave at the Brooks Atkinson Theatre. In 1976 he starred on Broadway in Arthur Miller's A Memory of Two Mondays opposite Meryl Streep and Tom Hulce at the Playhouse Theatre.

In 1979, Lithgow appeared in Bob Fosse's semi-autobiographical movie All That Jazz as Lucas Sergeant. The character was loosely based on the real-life Broadway director and choreographer Michael Bennett, known for his work on Follies, Company, Dreamgirls and A Chorus Line. Between 1978 and 1980, Lithgow appeared in ten episodes of the radio drama revival series CBS Radio Mystery Theater.

1980s 
 
Lithgow voiced the character of Yoda in the National Public Radio adaptations of The Empire Strikes Back and Return of the Jedi. He provided narration for the IMAX film Special Effects: Anything Can Happen.

In 1982 and 1983, Lithgow was nominated for the Academy Award for Best Supporting Actor for his performances as Roberta Muldoon in The World According to Garp and as Sam Burns in Terms of Endearment. Both films were screen adaptations of popular novels. In 1983, Lithgow appeared in a remake of the classic Twilight Zone episode "Nightmare at 20,000 Feet" in Twilight Zone: The Movie as the paranoid passenger made famous on the television show by William Shatner. In an interview with Bill Moyers, Lithgow reveals this role as his favorite of his film career.
Also in 1983 Lithgow appeared in a minor role in the nuclear apocalypse TV film The Day After.

In 1984, he starred in the film The Adventures of Buckaroo Banzai Across the 8th Dimension as Dr. Emilio Lizardo / Lord John Whorfin.  Also in 1984, he starred in 2010: The Year We Make Contact and played a pastor who condemns dancing in Footloose. In 1985, he starred opposite Jodie Foster in Mesmerized. Also in 1985, he starred in Santa Claus The Movie alongside Dudley Moore. In 1986, he starred in The Manhattan Project directed by Marshall Brickman. In 1987, Lithgow starred in the Bigfoot-themed family comedy Harry and the Hendersons.

In 1985, he starred in Requiem for a Heavyweight written by Rod Serling at the Martin Beck Theatre. In 1988 he starred in David Henry Hwang's M. Butterfly alongside BD Wong at the Eugene O'Neill Theatre.

In 1986, Lithgow received a Primetime Emmy Award for Outstanding Guest Actor in a Drama Series for his appearance in the episode The Doll of the Amazing Stories anthology series. Additionally, Lithgow has been nominated for an Emmy Award for Outstanding Supporting Actor in a Limited Series or a Special for The Day After (1983) and two Emmy Awards for Outstanding Lead Actor in a Miniseries or a Special for Resting Place (1986) and My Brother's Keeper (1995). Lithgow was approached about playing Dr. Frasier Crane on Cheers, but turned it down. Lithgow starred with Jeffrey Tambor in the NBC sitcom Twenty Good Years.

1990s 
In television, Lithgow is probably most widely known for his starring role as Dick Solomon in the 1996–2001 NBC sitcom 3rd Rock from the Sun. He received six consecutive nominations for the Primetime Emmy Award for Outstanding Lead Actor in a Comedy Series and won three times (1996, 1997, 1999). His son Ian regularly appeared alongside him as Leon, one of his physics students.

In 1991, he starred in the movie Ricochet opposite Denzel Washington as Earl Talbot Blake, a criminal seeking revenge against the policeman who sent him to prison. Also in 1991, he played missionary Leslie Huben in the film adaptation of Peter Matthiessen's novel At Play in the Fields of the Lord. In 1992, he starred as a man with multiple personality disorder in Brian De Palma's film Raising Cain. In 1993, he starred in Renny Harlin's film Cliffhanger opposite Sylvester Stallone as terrorist leader Eric Qualen.

2000s 
In 2001, Lithgow gained recognition for voicing the evil Lord Farquaad in the Academy Award-winning DreamWorks Animation film Shrek alongside Mike Myers, Eddie Murphy and Cameron Diaz. In 2002, he narrated Life's Greatest Miracle, a documentary about human embryonic development.

In 2002, Lithgow starred as J.J. Hunsecker in the Broadway adaptation of the 1957 film Sweet Smell of Success alongside Brian D'Arcy James. Lithgow won the Tony Award for Best Leading Actor in a Musical for his performance. In 2005, he starred on Broadway in the musical-comedy Dirty Rotten Scoundrels. alongside Norbert Leo Butz at the Imperial Theatre. While both were nominated for the Tony Award for Best Leading Actor in a Musical, Butz won over Lithgow. That same year Lithgow was elected into the American Theater Hall of Fame for his work on Broadway.

In 2003, Lithgow wrote the narrations for Christopher Wheeldon ballet Carnival of the Animals and appeared as the elephant character—nurse Mabel Buntz—with the New York City Ballet. He returned for a 2005 revival, the Houston Ballet production of the same show in 2007, and the Pennsylvania Ballet production of it in 2008. In 2007, Lithgow played Malvolio in the Royal Shakespeare Company's production of Twelfth Night, at The Courtyard Theatre, Stratford-upon-Avon, in the United Kingdom.

In 2004, he portrayed the moralistic, rigid father of Alfred Kinsey in that year's biopic Kinsey; Liam Neeson also starred. In 2006, Lithgow had a small role in the Academy Award-winning film Dreamgirls as Jerry Harris, a film producer offering Deena Jones (Beyoncé Knowles) a film role. In 2010, he appeared briefly in the romantic comedy Leap Year playing Amy Adams' father.

In 2005, Lithgow became the first ever actor to deliver a commencement speech at Harvard University and received an honorary Doctor of Arts from his alma mater. He was featured at Heinz Hall in Pittsburgh, Pennsylvania on December 4–6, 2009 for performances of Mozart's Requiem with the Pittsburgh Symphony Orchestra. He narrated some letters written by Wolfgang Amadeus Mozart, some poems and sections from the Book of Revelation in certain parts of the performance.

Since 2006, he has starred in Progresso commercials, advertising their soup brand. On March 5, 2009, Lithgow made a cameo on NBC's 30 Rock acting  in the episode "Goodbye, My Friend" with several references to his role in Harry and the Hendersons. In September 2009, Lithgow joined the cast of Dexter as Arthur Mitchell, a serial killer and Dexter Morgan's nemesis. He won a Golden Globe Award for this role and won an Emmy for Outstanding Guest Actor In A Drama Series. He guest starred on How I Met Your Mother  in the role of Barney Stinson's father, Jerry.

In 2008 through 2009, Lithgow played Joe Keller in a Broadway revival of Arthur Miller's All My Sons directed by Simon McBurney. Lithgow starred alongside Dianne Wiest, Patrick Wilson and Katie Holmes in her Broadway debut at the Schoenfeld Theatre.

He hosted Paloozaville, a children's Video on Demand program on Mag Rack based on his bestselling children's books. Lithgow also appears in Books By You, a children's computer game and guides them through the steps to personalize a pre-designed book.

2010s 
In 2010, Lithgow starred in the Off-Broadway production of Douglas Carter Beane's comedy Mr & Mrs Fitch alongside Jennifer Ehle at the Second Stage Theatre which ran from February 22, 2010, to April 4, 2010. In 2012 Lithgow returned to Broadway in David Auburn's play The Columnist, which played at the Manhattan Theatre Club. The performance earned him a nomination for the Tony Award for Best Actor in a Play.

On October 1, 2010, Lithgow appeared on Doug Benson's podcast Doug Loves Movies, with fellow guests Paul F. Tompkins and Jimmy Pardo. He has appeared on Chris Hardwick's show The Nerdist Podcast in 2012 and the WTF with Marc Maron podcast in 2019. In September 2011, Lithgow was featured in a one-night only production of Dustin Lance Black's play 8, a staged reenactment of the federal trial that overturned California's Prop 8 ban on same-sex marriage—as Attorney Theodore Olson to raise money for the American Foundation for Equal Rights. In 2015, Lithgow did the voice over work for Gore Vidal in the documentary film Best of Enemies with Kelsey Grammer. On October 18, 2017, Lithgow coauthored the New York Times daily crossword puzzle.

In the winter of 2012–13 he appeared in the London revival of Arthur Wing Pinero's The Magistrate as Police Magistrate Aeneas Posket at the National Theatre. In 2014, he returned to Central Park's Delacorte Theater and Shakespeare in the Park for the 2014 summer season in the title role of Shakespeare's King Lear, directed by Tony Award Winner Daniel Sullivan. The production was the first play at the theater since 1973 and Lithgow's first time there since 1975 when he had played Laertes. In Fall 2014, Lithgow returned to Broadway as Tobias in a revival of Edward Albee's A Delicate Balance. He starred opposite Glenn Close, Martha Plimpton, Lindsay Duncan, Bob Balaban and Clare Higgins. Pam MacKinnon directed the limited 18-week production at the John Golden Theatre.

Lithgow gained critical attention for starring in Ira Sachs' independent romance film Love Is Strange (2014). The film received a 94% on Rotten Tomatoes with the consensus reading "Held aloft by remarkable performances from John Lithgow and Alfred Molina, Love Is Strange serves as a graceful tribute to the beauty of commitment in the face of adversity." The film also received four Independent Spirit Award nominations, including for both Lithgow and Molina.

Lithgow during the 2010s appeared in Rise of the Planet of the Apes., Christopher Nolan's Interstellar (2014), Tommy Lee Jones' The Homesman (2014) and John Madden's Miss Sloane (2016)

In 2015, Lithgow made a cameo on Louis C.K.'s Louie in the season five episode "Sleepover" alongside Glenn Close, Michael Cera and Matthew Broderick. In 2017, Lithgow starred in Trial & Error as a professor who becomes implicated in the murder of his wife in the first season (spring 2017) of the mockumentary series.

In 2016, Lithgow appeared in the first season of The Crown (2016) portraying Winston Churchill. Lithgow won numerous awards for his performance including a Primetime Emmy Award and a Screen Actors Guild Award.

Lithgow then starred in the independent film Beatriz at Dinner (2017). Lithgow starred in the solo play John Lithgow: Stories by Heart, which opened on Broadway on January 11, 2018, at the American Airlines Theatre, written by Lithgow. Lithgow has performed this play around the U.S. starting at the Lincoln Center Theater with Willie Nelson in 2008, with a return performance at Lincoln Center slated for April to May 2019.

In 2018, Lithgow was one of the actors who voiced the audiobook A Day in the Life of Marlon Bundo. In 2019, Lithgow lent his voice for an audio play If You Win by Emily Chadick Weiss for Playing on Air and was released in spring 2020.

Lithgow starred as Bill Clinton opposite Laurie Metcalf as Hillary Clinton in the Lucas Hnath play Hillary and Clinton on Broadway at the John Golden Theatre. The play opened on April 18, 2019, and closed on June 23, 2019.
In 2019, Lithgow co-starred in Mindy Kaling's comedy Late Night. The film premiered at the Sundance Film Festival  was released June 7, 2019. He also played Fox News CEO Roger Ailes in the film Bombshell.

2020s 
In 2020, Lithgow portrayed the lawyer Elias Birchard "E.B." Jonathan in season one of the HBO reboot of Perry Mason. In the story, Mr. Birchard starts out as the employer of Mason, who is his investigator.

On June 28, 2021, Showtime confirmed that Lithgow would reprise his role of Arthur Mitchell in the 10-episode Dexter limited series, with Clyde Phillips returning as the head writer. The series premiered on November 7, 2021.
In August 2021, Lithgow joined the cast of Martin Scorsese's Killers of the Flower Moon as Prosecutor Leaward.

Other appearances 

Lithgow has done extensive work for children, including several books and albums. Some of his book titles are Marsupial Sue, Marsupial Sue Presents "The Runaway Pancake", Lithgow Party Paloozas!: 52 Unexpected Ways to Make a Birthday, Holiday, or Any Day a Celebration for Kids, Carnival of the Animals, A Lithgow Palooza: 101 Ways to Entertain and Inspire Your Kids, I'm a Manatee, Micawber, The Remarkable Farkle McBride, Mahalia Mouse Goes to College and I Got Two Dogs. He also appeared as a guest on Ants in Your Pants, a Canadian children's program.

Lithgow launched into a career as a recording artist with Singin' in the Bathtub, a 1999 album of children's music. In June 2002, Lithgow released his second children's album Farkle and Friends, but however, Waylon Jennings died four months before its release, and it was dedicated to his memory.  It was the musical companion to his book The Remarkable Farkle McBride, which tells the story of a young musical genius. Farkle and Friends features the vocal talents of Lithgow and Bebe Neuwirth, backed by the Bill Elliott Swing Orchestra as well. In August 2006, Lithgow released a Franz Schubert tribute album, The Sunny Side of the Street, his third children's album and first with Razor & Tie. This album features versions of classic songs from the Great American Songbook, including "Getting to Know You" and "Ya Gotta Have Pep". Produced by JC Hopkins, the album features guest appearances by Madeleine Peyroux, Wayne Knight, Sherie Rene Scott and Maude Maggart. Lithgow also makes occasional appearances on stage and television singing children's songs, accompanying himself on guitar.

In 2022, Lithgow presented Liv Ullman with the Academy Honorary Award at the Governors Awards.

Satirical works

Political portrayals
In June 2019, Lithgow portrayed Donald Trump in "The Investigation: A Search for Truth in Ten Acts", a live reading of special counsel Robert Mueller's report on Trump's 2016 presidential campaign. Staged on the altar of New York City's Riverside Church, the reading was created by playwright Robert Schenkkan and narrated by Annette Bening. It also featured Kevin Kline as Mueller, Joel Grey as Jeff Sessions, Jason Alexander as Chris Christie and Alfre Woodard as Hope Hicks.

He also portrayed Rudy Giuliani in a series of skits on the Late Show with Stephen Colbert.

Trump poetry books
In October 2019, Lithgow published Dumpty: The Age of Trump in Verse, a book of poems and illustrations. The project originated when Lithgow was asked to perform a Gilbert and Sullivan-style song he wrote about Michael Flynn. The book charted at number three on the New York Times hardcover nonfiction bestsellers in its first week. A follow-up book title Trumpty Dumpty Wanted a Crown was released on September 29, 2020, by Chronicle Books.

Voiceover work
Lithgow contributed voiceover work for the audio book version of A Day in the Life of Marlon Bundo, a 2018 children's book written by Jill Twiss, a comedy writer for HBO's television show Last Week Tonight with John Oliver. The book is a loose parody of Marlon Bundo's A Day in the Life of the Vice President, a children's book written by then-Vice President of the United States Mike Pence's daughter Charlotte Pence and illustrated by his wife Karen Pence.

Work

Filmography

Selected credits
{{columns-list|colwidth=22em|
 Obsession (1976)
 All That Jazz (1979)
 Blow Out (1981)
 The World According to Garp (1982)
 Terms of Endearment (1983)
 Twilight Zone (1984)
 Footloose (1984)
 The Adventures of Buckaroo Banzai Across the 8th Dimension (1984)
 Santa Claus: The Movie (1985)
 The Manhattan Project (1986)
 Harry and the Hendersons (1987)
 Memphis Belle (1990)
 L.A. Story (1991)
 Ricochet (1991)
 Raising Cain (1992)
 The Pelican Brief (1993)
 Cliffhanger (1993)
 A Good Man in Africa (1994)
 A Civil Action (1998)
 3rd Rock from the Sun (1996) 
 Rugrats in Paris: The Movie (2000)
 Shrek (2001)
 The Life and Death of Peter Sellers (2004)
 Kinsey (2004)
 Dreamgirls (2006)
 Confessions of a Shopaholic (2009)
 Leap Year (2010)
 Rise of the Planet of the Apes (2011)
 This Is 40 (2012)
 Love Is Strange (2014)
 Interstellar (2014)
 The Homesman (2014)
 Best of Enemies (2015)
 Miss Sloane (2016)
 Beatriz at Dinner (2017)
 Daddy's Home 2 (2017)
 Pitch Perfect 3 (2017)
 Late Night (2019)
 Pet Sematary (2019)
 Bombshell (2019)
 The Old Man (2022–present)
 Killers of the Flower Moon (2023)
}}

Discography
 Singin' in the Bathtub (1999, Sony Wonder)
 Farkle & Friends (2002, Kid Rhino)
 The Sunny Side of the Street (2006, Razor & Tie)

Bibliography
 The Remarkable Farkle McBride (2000, Simon & Schuster)
 Marsupial Sue (2001, Simon & Schuster)
 Micawber (2002, Simon & Schuster)
 I'm a Manatee (2003, Simon & Schuster)
 A Lithgow Palooza (2004, Simon & Schuster)
 Carnival of the Animals (2004, Simon & Schuster)
 Lithgow Party Paloozas!: 52 Unexpected Ways to Make a Birthday, Holiday, or Any Day a Celebration for Kids (2005, Simon & Schuster)
 Lithgow Paloozas!: Boredom Blasters (2005, Running Press)
 Marsupial Sue Presents "The Runaway Pancake" (2005, Simon & Schuster)
 Mahalia Mouse Goes to College (2007, Simon & Schuster)
 I Got Two Dogs (2008, Simon & Schuster)
 Dumpty: The Age of Trump in Verse (2019, Chronicle Prism)
 Trumpty Dumpty Wanted a Crown: Verses for a Despotic Age (2020, Chronicle Books)

Awards and honors

Lithgow has received two Tony Awards, six Emmy Awards, two Golden Globe Awards, three Screen Actors Guild Awards, an American Comedy Award, four Drama Desk Awards and has also been nominated for two Academy Awards and four Grammy Awards.HFPA Nominations and Winners HFPA Nominations and Winners  Lithgow has received a star on the Hollywood Walk of Fame and he was inducted into the American Theater Hall of Fame.

Lithgow was elected to the American Philosophical Society in 2019.

Personal life
Lithgow married Jean Taynton, a teacher in 1966. The couple had one son together, Ian (born 1972), who is an actor and a marriage and family therapist. Lithgow and his wife separated after he had an affair with actress Liv Ullmann and they divorced in 1980. Lithgow married UCLA history professor Mary Yeager in 1981 and they have a son and a daughter. Lithgow has been a supporter of Liverpool F.C. for many years.

References

External links

 
 
 
 
 
 John Lithgow at FEARnet
 Profile of John Lithgow – Downstage Center''
 2006 bio article on Lithgow
 Razor and Tie Artist Page
 
 
 John Lithgow speaks at the Oxonian Society November 15, 2007
 NYPL gallery of selected stage production photographs, 1967-1988

1945 births
20th-century American male actors
21st-century American male actors
Alumni of the London Academy of Music and Dramatic Art
American banjoists
American humorists
American male film actors
American male musical theatre actors
American male radio actors
American male Shakespearean actors
American male stage actors
American male television actors
American male voice actors
Audiobook narrators
Best Musical or Comedy Actor Golden Globe (television) winners
Best Supporting Actor Golden Globe (television) winners
Drama Desk Award winners
Harvard College alumni
 
Living people
Male actors from Rochester, New York
Outstanding Performance by a Lead Actor in a Comedy Series Primetime Emmy Award winners
Outstanding Performance by a Male Actor in a Comedy Series Screen Actors Guild Award winners
Outstanding Performance by a Male Actor in a Drama Series Screen Actors Guild Award winners
People from Princeton, New Jersey
Princeton High School (New Jersey) alumni
Royal Shakespeare Company members
Tony Award winners
Vietnam War draft evaders
Fulbright alumni